San Ginesio is a comune (municipality) in the Province of Macerata in the Italian region Marche, located about  southwest of Ancona and about  southwest of Macerata.

San Ginesio borders the following municipalities: Camporotondo di Fiastrone, Cessapalombo, Colmurano, Fiastra, Gualdo, Ripe San Ginesio, Sant'Angelo in Pontano, Sarnano, Tolentino.

Geography 
San Ginesio is located at 680 m above sea level and is the 5th highest and 12th largest municipality in the province of Macerata. It is borders via Picena, formerly SS 78, which connects the territory of Macerata with the Sibillini Mountains. It is located within the Monti Sibillini National Park and, thanks to its high position, the panorama ranges from the Conero to the Umbrian-Marche Apennines, reaching up to the Gran Sasso: for this reason San Ginesio is also called "the balcony of the Sibillini".

The village, also nicknamed "the village of 100 churches", also stands on a panoramic site that allows the view of the municipalities of Civitanova Marche, Gualdo, Ripe San Ginesio and Monte San Martino, of the hamlets of Passo San Ginesio, Pian di Pieca and Santa Croce (belonging to the municipality itself), of the hamlet of Sassotetto (municipality of Sarnano) and the view of the Adriatic Sea and the wind turbines of Serrapetrona. Within the municipal territory the Fiastrella stream is born and flows, already present in Roman times with the name Flussorius, which flows into the Chienti.

To avoid problems of water distribution, the country is equipped with a large reservoir, which in case of shortages compensates for the need.

The village is divided into four districts (Porta Ascarana, Offuna, Picena, Alvaneto) that compete every year in the traditional palio contest.

Origin of the name 
The first known mention of the name is "castrum Sancti Genesij", dating back to 995. It is probable that the place previously called "Avia" or "Oppidum esculanum" changed in the toponym San Ginesio after the passage of the Franks of Charlemagne.

The patron saint of the village is not St. Genesius of Arles, nor the St. Genesius of Brescello, as written by Gaetano Moroni, but St. Genesius of Rome, mime martyred in 303 by the emperor Diocletian for refusing to perform on stage, in a burlesque way, the baptism sacrament of Christians. For this reason the Saint became the patron saint of theatre people. In 1601, Pope Clement VIII granted San Ginesio the relic of the Saint consisting of a left arm; but since the martyr Ginesio and the martyr Eleuterio had been buried together, to avoid confusion, the "holy left arms" sent were two. Since then the relics are preserved in the largest church of the place, called the Collegiate.

Main sights 
The town include:

Religious architecture 
Abbazia di Santa Maria delle Macchie;
Collegiate Church of Santa Maria Assunta;
Former Convent of the Augustinians: It dates back to the 13th century, but the current buildings are from 1615 and later. The cloister contains frescoes with scenes from the life of Augustine, made between 1630 and 1640 by Domenico Malpiedi. The convent is home to the Institute of Higher Education Alberico Gentili.
San Gregorio;
San Francesco;
San Tommaso e Barnaba;
Sant'Agostino;
Santa Maria in Vepretis;
Santuario di San Liberato;
 Walls of St. Nicholas: The walls of St. Nicholas are a part of the current castle walls of the country. The saint with the imposition of the knee, prevented its fall.

Civil and military architecture 
 Castle of Roccacolonnalta: The castle of Roccacolonnalta, medieval castle belonged in the past to the noble family Brunforte, is a ruin located in the hamlet of Rocca. In the past the castle contained a church dedicated to St. Michel. When the inhabitants were driven out by the feudal princes Brunforte, they rebuilt other churches dedicated to St. Michel in honor of the one that was destroyed.
 Civic tower: structurally linked to the Collegiate Church, the civic tower was built in Romanesque style, while the bulb roof was added in the 17th century. Owned by the municipality, the tower houses the Bell of the Empire (Campana dell'Impero), a bronze bell designed by Guglielmo Ciarlantini, built by the foundry Campane Pasqualini in 1937 and signed by Benito Mussolini. Its realization is celebratory, in fact it celebrates the success of Italian colonialism in Ethiopia (Italian Ethiopia) of 1935 and 1936. The tower was damaged by the earthquake in Umbria and Marche in 1997 and was made safe by the earthquake swarm of 2016 and 2017.
 Hospital of the Pilgrims: The Hospital of the Pilgrims or of Saint Paul is a building of 1295 (13th century) in Romanesque style, with porch with low columns, a single order of loggias doubled in 1457 and an arch above built in brick
 Walls of San Ginesio: Among the major monumental reliefs are the walls of San Ginesio, started in 1308 (14th century) and completed in 150 years; they were built in sandstone, making it almost completely surrounded the town. They are equipped with towers and four entrance doors ("Porta Picena", "Porta Offuna", "Porta Ascarana" and "Porta Alvaneto"). The walls were erected to defend the country from possible attacks by other populations, especially the Fermo.

Parks and monuments 
 Park of Remembrance: Park located outside Porta Picena, one of four entrances to the village, is a park dedicated to the fallen in the First and Second World War. Built between 1925 and 1930 by Guglielmo Ciarlantini, the park still possesses the decorations of the fascist period at the entrance to it.
 Statue of Alberico Gentili: Statue made in bronze by the sculptor Giuseppe Guastalla in 1905. Located in the town square dedicated to him, like the statue, it stands in front of Corso Scipione Gentili.

References

External links
 
 

Cities and towns in the Marche